
Year 10 BC was either a common year starting on Tuesday, Wednesday or Thursday or a leap year starting on Tuesday or Wednesday (link will display the full calendar) of the Julian calendar (the sources differ, see leap year error for further information) and a common year starting on Sunday of the Proleptic Julian calendar. At the time, it was known as the Year of the Consulship of Maximus and Antonius (or, less frequently, year 744 Ab urbe condita). The denomination 10 BC for this year has been used since the early medieval period, when the Anno Domini calendar era became the prevalent method in Europe for naming years.

Events 
 By place  

 Roman Empire 

 The Obelisk of Montecitorio is brought from Egypt to Rome by Emperor Augustus to be erected as a sundial gnomon of the Solarium Augusti. It is now in the Piazza Montecitorio.
 The Romans build a bridge across the Rhine near Bonn (approximate date).
 A Roman military camp is established at Speyer (Germany).

Births 
 August 1 – Claudius, Roman emperor (d. AD 54)
 Agrippa I, king of Judea (d. AD 44)
 Antonia Tryphaena, Thracian princess
 Domitia Lepida, daughter of Lucius Domitius Ahenobarbus and Antonia Major (d. AD 54)
 Thusnelda, Germanic noblewoman (approximate date)

Deaths 
 Tryphon, Greek grammarian (b. c. 60 BC)

References